= National Center for Hydrology and Meteorology =

Government agency in Bhutan

The National Center for Hydrology and Meteorology (Dzongkha: རྒྱལ་ཡོངས་ཆུ་དཔྱད་དང་གནམ ་གཤིས་རིག་པའི་ལྟེ་བ།) is the National Meteorological service of the Kingdom of Bhutan.

== History ==
The Center was established in January 2016 as per the recommendation of the Organization Development (OD) exercises carried out by the Royal Civil Service Commission (RCSC) in August 2014 to provide scientific and technical information and services related to weather, climate, cryosphere, meteorology, hydrology and water resources for line agencies and public.
